Keselowski is a surname. Notable people with the name include:

 Bob Keselowski (1951–2021),  American stock car racing driver
 Brad Keselowski (born 1984), American stock car racing driver, son of Bob
 Brian Keselowski (born 1981), American stock car racing driver, brother of Brad
 Ron Keselowski (born 1946), American stock car racing driver, uncle of Brad and Brian, and brother of Bob

Surnames of Polish origin